Jonathan Javier Camacho Riera (born 3 October 1985) is a Venezuelan swimmer. He competed in the Men's 50 metre freestyle at the 2008 Summer Olympics.

External links
Jonathan Camacho at Sports-Reference

Living people
Swimmers at the 2008 Summer Olympics
Olympic swimmers of Venezuela
Venezuelan male swimmers
1985 births
Place of birth missing (living people)
21st-century Venezuelan people